Krishna's Butterball (also known as Vaan Irai Kal and Krishna's Gigantic Butterball) is a gigantic balancing rock, granite-boulder resting on a short incline in the historical coastal resort town of Mamallapuram in Tamil Nadu state of India.

Being part of the Group of Monuments at Mamallapuram, a UNESCO World Heritage Site built during the seventh- and eighth-century CE as Hindu religious monuments by the Pallava dynasty, it is a popular tourist attraction locally. It is listed as a protected national monument by the Archeological Survey of India.

Etymology
The original name, Vaan Irai Kal, according to the Atlas Obscura, translates from Tamil as "Stone of Sky God". According to Hindu scriptures, lord Krishna often stole butter from his mother's butter handi; this may have led to the namesake of the boulder. In 1969, a tour-guide is said to credit its present name, Krishna's Butterball, to Indira Gandhi who was on a tour of the city.

History
The Pallava king Narasimhavarman (630–668 CE) also made a failed attempt to move the boulder. The Indian Tamil king Raja Raja Chola (985 and 1014 CE) was inspired by the balance of this massive stone boulder and it led to the creation of never-falling mud dolls called Tanjavur Bommai, which having a half-spherical base tends to come back to its original position every time one tries to make it fall. In 1908, then-governor of the city Arthur Havelock made an attempt to use seven elephants to move the boulder from its position due to safety concerns but with no success. On 12 October 2019, Indian Prime Minister Narendra Modi and Chinese President Xi Jinping took a photo in front of Krishna's Butterball holding hands during their second "informal summit".

Details
Krishna's Butterball is located in the tourist town Mahabalipuram in Chengalpattu district in the state of Tamil Nadu in south India. To the south, Pondicherry is  distant.
 
It is said to have been at the same place for 1,200 years. A part of the boulder on top back has broken away, making it look like a half-spherical rock from the back, while it appears round shaped from the other three sides.

Gallery

In media
 Krishna's butter ball was shown in an episode of History TV18's television infotainment show, OMG! Yeh Mera India, hosted by Krushna Abhishek.

See also
 List of gravity hills in India

References

Krishna
Mahabalipuram
Natural monoliths
Rock formations of India
Tourist attractions in Tamil Nadu